Goeppertia loeseneri (syn. Calathea loeseneri), the Brazilian star calathea, is a species of plant belonging to the Marantaceae family. It is native to Peru, northern Brazil, Colombia, and Ecuador. It can grow to a height of 1.2m (4 feet).

Goeppertia loeseneri is widely cultivated as an ornamental plant with star-shaped pink flowers outside its native range.

References

loeseneri
Garden plants
Flora of Bolivia
Flora of Colombia
Flora of Ecuador
Flora of Peru
Flora of North Brazil
Plants described in 1931